In mathematics, Tychonoff's theorem states that the product of any collection of compact topological spaces is compact with respect to the product topology. The theorem is named after Andrey Nikolayevich Tikhonov (whose surname sometimes is transcribed Tychonoff), who proved it first in 1930 for powers of the closed unit interval and in 1935 stated the full theorem along with the remark that its proof was the same as for the special case. The earliest known published proof is contained in a 1935 article of Tychonoff, A., "Uber einen Funktionenraum", Mathematical Annals, 111, pp. 762–766 (1935). (This reference is mentioned in "Topology" by Hocking and Young, Dover Publications, Ind.)

Tychonoff's theorem is often considered as perhaps the single most important result in general topology (along with Urysohn's lemma). The theorem is also valid for topological spaces based on fuzzy sets.

Topological definitions 

The theorem depends crucially upon the precise definitions of compactness and of the product topology; in fact, Tychonoff's 1935 paper defines the product topology for the first time. Conversely, part  of its importance is to give confidence that these particular definitions are the most useful (i.e. most well-behaved) ones.

Indeed, the Heine–Borel definition of compactness—that every covering of a space by open sets admits a finite subcovering—is relatively recent. More popular in the 19th and early 20th centuries was the Bolzano-Weierstrass criterion that every bounded infinite sequence admits a convergent subsequence, now called sequential compactness. These conditions are equivalent for metrizable spaces, but neither one implies the other in the class of all topological spaces.

It is almost trivial to prove that the product of two sequentially compact spaces is sequentially compact—one passes to a subsequence for the first component and then a subsubsequence for the second component. An only slightly more elaborate "diagonalization" argument establishes the sequential compactness of a countable product of sequentially compact spaces. However, the product of continuum many copies of the closed unit interval (with its usual topology) fails to be sequentially compact with respect to the product topology, even though it is compact by Tychonoff's theorem (e.g., see ).

This is a critical failure: if X is a completely regular Hausdorff space, there is a natural embedding from X into [0,1]C(X,[0,1]), where C(X,[0,1]) is the set of continuous maps from X to [0,1]. The compactness of [0,1]C(X,[0,1]) thus shows that every completely regular Hausdorff space embeds in a compact Hausdorff space (or, can be "compactified".) This construction is the Stone–Čech compactification. Conversely, all subspaces of compact Hausdorff spaces are completely regular Hausdorff, so this characterizes the completely regular Hausdorff spaces as those that can be compactified. Such spaces are now called Tychonoff spaces.

Applications 

Tychonoff's theorem has been used to prove many other mathematical theorems. These include theorems about compactness of certain spaces such as the Banach–Alaoglu theorem on the weak-* compactness of the unit ball of the dual space of a normed vector space, and the Arzelà–Ascoli theorem characterizing the sequences of functions in which every subsequence has a uniformly convergent subsequence. They also include statements less obviously related to compactness, such as the De Bruijn–Erdős theorem stating that every minimal k-chromatic graph is finite, and the Curtis–Hedlund–Lyndon theorem providing a topological characterization of cellular automata.

As a rule of thumb, any sort of construction that takes as input a fairly general object (often of an algebraic, or topological-algebraic nature) and outputs a compact space is likely to use Tychonoff: e.g., the Gelfand space of maximal ideals of a commutative C*-algebra, the Stone space of maximal ideals of a Boolean algebra, and the Berkovich spectrum of a commutative Banach ring.

Proofs of Tychonoff's theorem 

1) Tychonoff's 1930 proof used the concept of a complete accumulation point.

2) The theorem is a quick corollary of the Alexander subbase theorem.

More modern proofs have been motivated by the following considerations: the approach to compactness via convergence of subsequences leads to a simple and transparent proof in the case of countable index sets. However, the approach to convergence in a topological space using sequences is sufficient when the space satisfies the first axiom of countability (as metrizable spaces do), but generally not otherwise. However, the product of uncountably many metrizable spaces, each with at least two points, fails to be first countable. So it is natural to hope that a suitable notion of convergence in arbitrary spaces will lead to a compactness criterion generalizing sequential compactness in metrizable spaces that will be as easily applied to deduce the compactness of products. This has turned out to be the case.

3) The theory of convergence via filters, due to Henri Cartan and developed by Bourbaki in 1937, leads to the following criterion: assuming the ultrafilter lemma, a space is compact if and only if each ultrafilter on the space converges. With this in hand, the proof becomes easy: the (filter generated by the) image of an ultrafilter on the product space under any projection map is an ultrafilter on the factor space, which therefore converges, to at least one xi. One then shows that the original ultrafilter converges to x = (xi). In his textbook, Munkres gives a reworking of the Cartan–Bourbaki proof that does not explicitly use any filter-theoretic language or preliminaries.

4) Similarly, the Moore–Smith theory of convergence via nets, as supplemented by Kelley's notion of a universal net, leads to the criterion that a space is compact if and only if each universal net on the space converges. This criterion leads to a proof (Kelley, 1950) of Tychonoff's theorem, which is, word for word, identical to the Cartan/Bourbaki proof using filters, save for the repeated substitution of "universal net" for "ultrafilter base".

5) A proof using nets but not universal nets was given in 1992 by Paul Chernoff.

Tychonoff's theorem and the axiom of choice 

All of the above proofs use the axiom of choice (AC) in some way. For instance, the third proof uses that every filter is contained in an ultrafilter (i.e., a maximal filter), and this is seen by invoking Zorn's lemma. Zorn's lemma is also used to prove Kelley's theorem, that every net has a universal subnet. In fact these uses of AC are essential: in 1950 Kelley proved that Tychonoff's theorem implies the axiom of choice in ZF. Note that one formulation of AC is that the Cartesian product of a family of nonempty sets is nonempty; but since the empty set is most certainly compact, the proof cannot proceed along such straightforward lines. Thus Tychonoff's theorem joins several other basic theorems (e.g. that every vector space has a basis) in being equivalent to AC.

On the other hand, the statement that every filter is contained in an ultrafilter does not imply AC. Indeed, it is not hard to see that it is equivalent to the Boolean prime ideal theorem (BPI), a well-known intermediate point between the axioms of Zermelo-Fraenkel set theory (ZF) and the ZF theory augmented by the axiom of choice (ZFC). A first glance at the second proof of Tychnoff may suggest that the proof uses no more than (BPI), in contradiction to the above. However, the spaces in which every convergent filter has a unique limit are precisely the Hausdorff spaces. In general we must select, for each element of the index set, an element of the nonempty set of limits of the projected ultrafilter base, and of course this uses AC. However, it also shows that the compactness of the product of compact Hausdorff spaces can be proved using (BPI), and in fact the converse also holds. Studying the strength of Tychonoff's theorem for various restricted classes of spaces is an active area in set-theoretic topology.

The analogue of Tychonoff's theorem in pointless topology does not require any form of the axiom of choice.

Proof of the axiom of choice from Tychonoff's theorem 

To prove that Tychonoff's theorem in its general version implies the axiom of choice, we establish that every infinite cartesian product of non-empty sets is nonempty. The trickiest part of the proof is introducing the right topology. The right topology, as it turns out, is the cofinite topology with a small twist. It turns out that every set given this topology automatically becomes a compact space. Once we have this fact, Tychonoff's theorem can be applied; we then use the finite intersection property (FIP) definition of compactness. The proof itself (due to J. L. Kelley) follows:

Let {Ai} be an indexed family of nonempty sets, for i ranging in I (where I is an arbitrary indexing set). We wish to show that the cartesian product of these sets is nonempty. Now, for each i, take Xi to be Ai with the index i itself tacked on (renaming the indices using the disjoint union if necessary, we may assume that i is not a member of Ai, so simply take Xi = Ai ∪ {i}).

Now define the cartesian product

along with the natural projection maps πi which take a member of X to its ith term.

We give each Xj the topology whose open sets are: the empty set, the singleton {i}, the set Xi. This makes Xi compact, and by Tychonoff's theorem, X is also compact (in the product topology). The projection maps are continuous; all the Ai'''s are closed, being complements of the singleton open set {i} in Xi. So the inverse images πi−1(Ai) are closed subsets of X. We note that

and prove that these inverse images have the FIP. Let i1, ..., iN be a finite collection of indices in I. Then the finite product Ai1 × ... × AiNis non-empty (only finitely many choices here, so AC is not needed); it merely consists of N-tuples. Let  a = (a1, ..., aN) be such an N-tuple. We extend a to the whole index set: take a to the function f defined by f(j) = ak if j = ik, and f(j) = j otherwise. This step is where the addition of the extra point to each space is crucial, for it allows us to define f for everything outside of the N-tuple in a precise way without choices (we can already choose, by construction, j from Xj ). πik(f) = ak is obviously an element of each Aik so that f is in each inverse image; thus we have

By the FIP definition of compactness, the entire intersection over I'' must be nonempty, and the proof is complete.

See also

Notes

References 
 .
 .
 .
 .
 .
  
 .
 
  
 .

External links 

 Mizar system proof: http://mizar.org/version/current/html/yellow17.html#T23

Axiom of choice
Theorems in topology